The Party of Renewal and Equity (PRE) is a political party in Morocco.

History and profile
The party was founded in 2002.

In the parliamentary election, held on 7 September 2007, the party won 4 out of 325 seats.

References

2002 establishments in Morocco
Liberal parties in Morocco
Political parties established in 2002
Political parties in Morocco